Drankin' & Drivin' is the nineteenth studio album by American rapper Z-Ro, released on July 15, 2016 under 1 Deep Entertainment and was distributed by EMPIRE. The album features a guest appearance from fellow American rapper Krayzie Bone, of Bone Thugs-n-Harmony.

Track listing

Charts

References

2016 albums
Z-Ro albums